Alessandro Verre (born 17 November 2001) is an Italian cyclist, who currently rides for UCI ProTeam .

Major results

Road

2019
 3rd Trofeo Buffoni
 3rd Trofeo Guido Dorigo
 5th G.P. Sportivi Sovilla-La Piccola Sanremo
2021
 1st Stage 1 Giro della Valle d'Aosta
 6th Overall Giro Ciclistico d'Italia
2022
 10th GP Industria & Artigianato di Larciano

References

External links

2001 births
Living people
Italian male cyclists
Sportspeople from the Province of Potenza
Cyclists from Basilicata